Sport Unie Brion-Trappers is a Curaçao football club, based in Willemstad, their home stadium being Stadion dr. Antoine Maduro. It plays in the first division of Curaçao League.

Achievements
Netherlands Antilles Championship: 4
 1969, 1980, 1983, 1984

Curaçao League: 20
 1938, 1940, 1944, 1946, 1947, 1950, 1951, 1953, 1954, 1955,1956, 1958, 1971, 1977, 1979, 1980, 1982, 1983, 1984, 1985

Performance in CONCACAF competitions
CONCACAF Champions' Cup: 8 appearances
CONCACAF Champions' Cup 1970 – First Round – (Caribbean Zone) – Lost to  Racing CH 6 – 3 in the global result.
CONCACAF Champions' Cup 1973 – Second Round – (Caribbean Zone) – Lost to  SV Transvaal 9 – 3 in the global result.
CONCACAF Champions' Cup 1980 – Unknown Round – (Caribbean Zone) – Lost to  SV Robinhood 5 – 2 in the global result.
CONCACAF Champions' Cup 1981 – Second Round – (Caribbean Zone) – Lost to  SV Transvaal 3 – 1 in the global result.
CONCACAF Champions' Cup 1983 – Third Round – (Caribbean Zone) – Lost to  SV Robinhood 4 – 1 in the global result.
CONCACAF Champions' Cup 1984 – First Round – (Caribbean Zone) – Lost to  Cygne Noir 2 – 1 in the global result.
CONCACAF Champions' Cup 1985 – unknown results
CONCACAF Champions' Cup 1991 – First Round – (Caribbean Zone) –  Lost to  SV Transvaal 1 – 0 in the global result.

Current squad 2013–14

Former players

  Sanne van Leeuwen
  Willy Bories Pérez

References

Football clubs in Curaçao
Football clubs in the Netherlands Antilles
Association football clubs established in 1925
1925 establishments in Curaçao